Stephen David Gardner (born 7 October 1958) is an English former professional footballer who played as a midfielder and striker. He played for Ipswich Town and Oldham Athletic in England, Karlskrona, IFK Göteborg and GAIS in Sweden, as well as the Dallas Sidekicks in America.

References

1958 births
Living people
People from Hemsworth
English footballers
Association football midfielders
Association football forwards
Ipswich Town F.C. players
Oldham Athletic A.F.C. players
FK Karlskrona players
IFK Göteborg players
Dallas Sidekicks (original MISL) players
GAIS players
Allsvenskan players
English Football League players
English expatriate footballers
English expatriate sportspeople in Sweden
English expatriate sportspeople in the United States
Expatriate footballers in Sweden
Expatriate soccer players in the United States